Winpok is a village in Kawkareik District, Kayin State of Myanmar (Burma).

References

External links
Winpok/ Satellite map at Maplandia.com

Populated places in Kayin State